Abrocitinib, sold under the brand name Cibinqo, is a medication used for the treatment of atopic dermatitis (eczema). It is a Janus kinase inhibitor and it was developed by Pfizer. It is taken by mouth.

The most common side effects include nausea (feeling sick), headache, acne, herpes simplex (viral infection of the mouth or the genitals), increased levels of creatine phosphokinase in the blood (an enzyme released into the blood when muscle is damaged), vomiting, dizziness and pain in the upper belly.

Abrocitinib was approved for medical use in the European Union in December 2021, and in the United States in January 2022.

Medical uses 
In the EU, abrocitinib is indicated for the treatment of moderate-to-severe atopic dermatitis in adults who are candidates for systemic therapy.

In the US, abrocitinib is indicated for the treatment of people twelve years of age and older with refractory, moderate-to-severe atopic dermatitis whose disease is not adequately controlled with other systemic drug products, including biologics, or when use of those therapies is inadvisable.

Side effects
The most common adverse effects in studies were upper respiratory tract infection, headache, nausea, and diarrhea.

Pharmacology

Mechanism of action
It is a selective inhibitor of the enzyme janus kinase 1 (JAK1).

Pharmacokinetics
Abrocitinib is quickly absorbed from the gut and generally reaches highest blood plasma concentrations within one hour. Only 1.0 to 4.4% of the dose are found unmetabolized in the urine.

History 
 April 2016: initiation of Phase 2b trial
 December 2017: initiation of JADE Mono-1 Phase 3 trial
 May 2018: Results of Phase 2b trial posted
 October 2019: Results of Phase 3 trial presented
 June 2020: Results of second Phase 3 trial published

Society and culture

Legal status 
In October 2021, the Committee for Medicinal Products for Human Use (CHMP) of the European Medicines Agency (EMA) adopted a positive opinion, recommending the granting of a marketing authorization for the medicinal product Cibinqo, intended for the treatment of atopic dermatitis. The applicant for this medicinal product is Pfizer Europe MA EEIG. In December 2021, the European Commission approved abrocitinib for the treatment of atopic dermatitis.

In January 2022, the US Food and Drug Administration (FDA) approved abrocitinib for adults with moderate-to-severe atopic dermatitis.

References

External links 
 
 
 
 

Cyclobutanes
Non-receptor tyrosine kinase inhibitors
Pfizer brands
Pyrrolopyrimidines
Sulfonamides